Demir Kapija is a municipality in southern part of North Macedonia. Demir Kapija, which means "iron door" or "iron gate" in Turkish, is also the name of the town where the municipal seat is found. Demir Kapija Municipality is part of the Vardar Statistical Region.

Geography
The Došnica river which springs from Mount Kožuf is the source of drinking water and hydroelectric power production (at Čiflik) for the municipality.

The municipality borders
 Negotino Municipality to the northwest,
 Konče Municipality to the northeast,
 Valandovo Municipality to the east,
 Gevgelija Municipality to the southeast, and
 Kavadarci Municipality to the southwest.

Demographics
According to the last national census from 2021 this municipality has 3,777 inhabitants.

Ethnic groups in the municipality include:

Populated settlements include:
 Demir Kapija (seat)
 Barovo
 Besvica
 Bistrenci
 Čelevec
 Čiflik
 Dračevica
 Dren
 Iberli
 Klisura
 Košarka
 Koprišnica
 Korešnica
 Prždevo
 Strmaševo

References

 
Vardar Statistical Region
Municipalities of North Macedonia

it:Demir Kapija